Thabiso Benedict Moeng (born 25 January 1983) is a male South African long-distance runner. He competed in the marathon event at the 2015 World Championships in Athletics in Beijing, China, but did not finish. In 2019, he competed in the men's marathon at the 2019 World Athletics Championships held in Doha, Qatar. He did not finish his race.

See also
 South Africa at the 2015 World Championships in Athletics

References

External links

1983 births
Living people
Place of birth missing (living people)
South African male long-distance runners
World Athletics Championships athletes for South Africa
South African male marathon runners